Penicillium goetzii is a species of the genus of ascomycetous fungi.

References

goetzii
Fungi described in 2012